West Seattle is a conglomeration of neighborhoods in Seattle, Washington, United States. It comprises two of the thirteen districts, Delridge and Southwest, and encompasses all of Seattle west of the Duwamish River. It was incorporated as an independent town in 1902 before being annexed by Seattle five years later. Among the area's attractions are its saltwater beach parks along Elliott Bay and Puget Sound, including Alki Beach Park and Lincoln Park. The area is also known for its views of the Olympic Mountains to the west and the Cascade Range to the east. One-third of Seattle's green space and urban forest is located in West Seattle, much of it in the West Duwamish Greenbelt.

Neighborhoods

High Point

High Point is a neighborhood in the Delridge district. The neighborhood is located on the east side of 35th Ave SW, with approximate north and south boundaries at SW Juneau Street and SW Myrtle Street.

The hill is dominated by two large water towers; it is also the location of Our Lady of Guadalupe School and Parish, on the peak of the highest hill in West Seattle. It is also known for the High Point Projects which were torn down in 2005 to make way for new mixed-income housing.  High Point is one of Seattle's most diverse neighborhoods, with a substantial immigrant population from Southeast Asia and East Africa.

Redevelopment

The neighborhood was originally developed during World War II to provide government housing, and it remained a district of predominantly low-income housing through the 1990s. In 2003, the Seattle Housing Authority began work on the first phase of a six-year project to redevelop High Point into a mixed-income community. The redevelopment removed all existing housing, roads, and utilities. In their place, new roads, underground infrastructure, about 1,600 new housing units, and community facilities were built.

The redevelopment embraced many sustainable development principles. The site and rental housing are certified at the highest BuiltGreen levels; most housing is Energy Star rated. The site makes extensive use of permeable paving, including porous sidewalks, parking areas, and the only porous pavement street in the state of Washington.  Some houses were built to reduce symptoms for people with asthma.  The neighborhood redevelopment plan has been recognized with some of the most prestigious land use and development awards, among them the 2007 ULI Global Award of Excellence, the 2007 EPA National Award for Smart Growth, and the 2007 Rudy Bruner Award for Urban Excellence.

Alki

Alki Point is traditionally credited as the point where the Denny Party founded Seattle prior to moving across Elliott Bay to what is now Downtown. A similar landing at Alki has been reenacted annually since 1950 as part of the week-long Seafair celebration of Seattle's marine and boating heritage. Seafair coincides with West Seattle festivities including Hi-Yu and the West Seattle Summer Fest street festival held each July. Along with its historical significance Alki is also home to the most popular beach in the Seattle area. Fittingly named Alki Beach, it features a long strip of sandy beach full of driftwood, seashells, and fire pits. Low tides offer West Seattleites an opportunity to explore marine life in tidepools. Alki also hosts a flat bike and running trail from which visitors can view the Seattle skyline, Puget Sound, and the Olympic mountains.

The Junction

The Junction is the name used for the commercial district that centers on the intersection of California Avenue S.W. and S.W. Alaska Street. It is sometimes called "West Seattle Junction" or "Alaska Junction" by local residents.

West Seattle also has two other intersections of note: the Admiral Junction in the northern part of the peninsula where California Avenue S.W. and S.W. Admiral Way meet, and the Morgan Street Junction at the southern end where Fauntleroy Way S.W., S.W. Morgan Street, and California Avenue S.W. intersect.

Other neighborhoods
The Westwood Village shopping center, between S.W. Trenton and S.W. Barton Streets in the south end of West Seattle, has undergone several makeovers and now provides a mall-like shopping experience, including a Target and a Marhsall's. However, it is unlikely that a movie theater will be allowed here because of restricted parking.

Before the annexation of West Seattle, the neighborhood of White Center radiated north and south of Roxbury, but now with the city line going down the middle of the old neighborhood is it unclear whether the northern part of the area should still be referred to as part of the White Center neighborhood.

West Seattle also includes suburban neighborhoods in the southwest end, including Gatewood, Fauntleroy, Arbor Heights and Arroyo Heights in the southernmost section of West Seattle.

Transportation

The high-level West Seattle Bridge and the low-level Spokane Street Bridge connect northern West Seattle to Downtown Seattle and SODO. The high-level bridge was closed from 2020 to 2022 for extensive repairs.

West Seattle is served by bus service from King County Metro, including the RapidRide C Line. There is a Washington State Ferries dock in the Fauntleroy neighborhood, with service to Vashon Island and to Southworth on the Kitsap Peninsula. The passenger-only  King County Water Taxi also runs between Duwamish Head and downtown Seattle.

History
Numerous sites exist with historical information on West Seattle, which is Seattle's oldest neighborhood and birthplace of Seattle proper. The Southwest Seattle Historical Society maintains the Log House Museum at Alki Point.

Notable residents

Among West Seattle's current and former notable residents are Pearl Jam lead singer Eddie Vedder; Pearl Jam guitarist Jeff Ament; actress Dyan Cannon; actor Steven Hill; nature photographer Art Wolfe; writer and journalist Amanda Knox; actress and burlesque performer Gypsy Rose Lee; restaurateur, folk singer, and former Seattle City Council member Ivar Haglund; fantasy author Terry Brooks; mountain climbers Jim Whittaker and Lou Whittaker; author Tobias Wolff; astronaut Gregory C. Johnson; Soundgarden singer Chris Cornell; The Flying Karamazov Brothers member Sam Williams; author, journalist, and screenwriter Jeff Jensen; former Seattle mayor Greg Nickels; mountain climber and guide Scott Fischer; science fiction and fantasy author Cat Rambo; actress Frances Farmer; actress Meg Tilly; musician Bill Rieflin; artist Francesca Sundsten; former Pittsburgh Pirates player Ed Bahr; NFL and Canadian Football League player Byron Bailey; author Nicholas Johnson; singer/songwriter Brandi Carlile; U.S. Representative Pramila Jayapal; TV & Radio talent/writer Cindi Rinehart.

Media

The community is served by the West Seattle Herald, now merged into the Westside Weekly, which publishes weekly in print and offers continuous updates throughout the day on its website; and by the West Seattle Blog, which has been published online since 2005.

Education

West Seattle is home to South Seattle College, West Seattle High School, Chief Sealth International High School, Seattle Lutheran High School, Gatewood Elementary School, Madison Middle School,  Denny International Middle School, Roxhill Elementary School, K-5 STEM at Boren, Alki Elementary School, Lafayette Elementary School, Highland Park Elementary School, Sanislo Elementary School, Pathfinder K-8, Holy Family School Seattle, Holy Rosary West Seattle, Genesee Hill Elementary School, Our Lady of Guadalupe, Hope Lutheran School, Arbor Heights Elementary School, and Fairmount Park Elementary School.

Parks and recreation

West Seattle has many parks along the water front, including Lincoln Park and the Emma Schmitz Overlook to Jack Block park facing the port. The West Seattle Golf Course, West Seattle Stadium and Camp Long Outdoor Learning Center are found in the middle of the peninsula with unique opportunities to recreate outdoors including overnight camping in rustic cabins.  In addition, Seattle Parks and Recreation maintains Community Centers (Alki, Delridge, and Hiawatha), Coleman Pool, SouthWest Pool and the SouthWest Teen Life Center. There is a historic bath house on Alki Beach as well as the Dakota Place Park with its restored light station.

List of neighborhoods
 Admiral, also known as North Admiral
 Alki
 Arbor Heights
 Belvedere
 Delridge
 Fauntleroy
 Fairmount Park
 Gatewood
 Genesee
 Harbor Ave
 Highland Park
 Lincoln Park
 Luna Park
 Morgan Junction
 Pigeon Point
 Puget Ridge
 Riverview
 Roxbury
 Schmitz Park
 Seaview
 Sunrise Heights
 Sunset
 Westwood
 West Seattle Junction

References

External links

 
 Guide to the City of West Seattle Records 1902-1910

 
Former municipalities in Washington (state)